Elfen Lied is a Japanese manga series, written by Lynn Okamoto. It premiered in the magazine Weekly Young Jump on June 6, 2002  New chapters continued to appear in the magazine until August 25, 2005, when the final chapter was published. The series' 107 chapters were also published in twelve tankōbon volumes by Shueisha from October 18, 2002 through November 18, 2005.

At the end of volumes 1, 2, 3, and 5 special chapters were added. These chapters read like independent short stories which focused on characters that were not featured in the main plot. At the end of volume 8, there were two special chapters which included several Elfen Lied characters; however these were also more or less independent short stories.

The manga has been translated and released in Germany, Mexico, Portugal and Taiwan, by Tokyopop, Grupo Editorial Vid, Panini Comics and Ever Glory Publishing respectively. On July 4, 2018, Dark Horse Comics announced that it has licensed the manga for a northern American release, and they released it in four omnibus volumes (three volumes per omnibus), from May 22, 2019 through September 9, 2020.



Volumes

References

Elfen Lied
Elfen Lied